Merse may refer to:
The Merse (river), in the Italian region of Tuscany
The Val di Merse, an area including the valley of the river Merse
 the Merse (Scotland), a territory located on the boundaries of Scotland and England on the east side; today part of Berwickshire
 A Scottish name for Salt marsh, an environment periodically flooded by sea water
Merse (politician), an Inner Mongolian revolutionary of the 1920s and 1930s